Bound by Flame is a fantasy-themed action role-playing game that was released on 9 May 2014. Bound by Flame puts the player in the role of a victim of demonic possession, where it is necessary to choose between the evil powers that are offered or rejecting them in favor of developing heroic talents.

Gameplay
Bound by Flame lets the players customize their character. During the creation of their hero, players will be able choose their gender and choose from three pre-made models.

Through its different chapters, Bound by Flame will offer many quests around a primary adventure. Depending on the choices made by the player and the influence of the demon, some chapters will offer different scenarios and a different experience.

Bound by Flame also includes a crafting system, allowing players to create and improve equipment, including their armor and weapons. Several companions will join the player during their quest, and will, depending on the player's actions, develop friendship, romance or rivalry. Using the crafting system, the player can customize weapons and armour with more depth than most other games.

When fighting enemies, characters can use three different fighting styles. One relies on slow, heavy, damaging strikes with weapons like axes and hammers and a push/kick ability to interrupt enemies or break their defences. Another uses small weapons like daggers for quick strikes and gives a dodge ability to evade enemy attacks. The third style utilizes fire attacks for major damage and can be combined with the other two fighting styles to do things like enhancing weapons with fire damage. Each of the three styles has its own skill tree with both passive and active abilities.

During combat, the player can also use other attacks aside from striking with a weapon, like traps and abilities earned from the skill trees.

Plot
Taking place in the fictional land of Vertiel in the middle of a war between the Elves and Red Scribes against an assembly of immortal necromancers known as the Ice Lords and their undead empire, the Frozen Shadows, the story follows an unnamed mercenary known only by the pseudonym of Vulcan, a demolition specialist in service to the illustrious sellsword company, the Freeborn Blades. Vulcan is a mysterious person whose past is largely forgotten by him/her, as his/her past is largely mere invention to stave off questions regarding his/her past. The Freeborn Blades are under the employment of the Red Scribes in their attempt to hold back the army of undead Deadwalkers in service to the Ice Lords. During a mysterious ritual conducted by the Red Scribes, something goes wrong and Vulcan is possessed by a fiery demon, endowing him/her with inhuman powers of strength and magical abilities of pyromancy, which he/she then uses to overpower and defeat an undead Juggernaut beast.

The unnamed Demon speaks to Vulcan in his/her subconscious, scolding him/her for their weakness and cowardice and blaming their situation on him/her. The Demon demands that Vulcan liberate the Worldheart, the literal heart that sustains the world, from the Ice Lords so that he may return there.

A victim of a demonic influence will have to choose between the evil powers offered or rejecting them in favor of developing heroic talents. Dangers and enemies will become more fearsome in battle throughout, increasing the temptations to acquire more power by giving up part of the hero's soul to the demon while progression of the demonic influence will be reflected by the transformation of the hero's body. After overcoming his/her enemies and recruiting various allies throughout his/her journey, the protagonist assaults an ice lord palace where he/she confronts and defeats the game's antagonist Lord Blackfrost and then ventures off to free the Worldheart from the ice lord's control.

The game features three endings, depending which choices the player made during the game. In the finale the player's actions determine which ending will play out: the sacrifice ending (involves the player rejecting the demon's powers and killing themselves), demon ending (the player becomes a full demon thus destroying the world of Vertiel) and the king ending (the player exterminates the demon and becomes the ruler of Vertiel).

Development
Jehanne Rousseau, CEO of Spiders, said "Bound by Flame is like Mars on the game-play aspect, but of course the universe is completely different. We really tried to listen to all the critics we had from the players, from the press, and we tried to work differently on some aspects that were very poor in Mars. Now we have more of a budget and more time to develop it, so we tried to improve all the things we can." The game was not released on the Xbox One due to the team not being given development kits for the console in time.

The game's soundtrack was composed by Olivier Deriviere who has won awards for his work in video games such as Remember Me and Assassin's Creed 4. In an interview, Derivière stated, "I really wanted to capture a sense of loneliness and despair with the music so I created unique soundscapes to support the different locations and atmospheres." Derivière went on to talk about the possessed hero Vulcan and that he "thought it would be very interesting to have a contrast between the dead and the living." In the same interview, singer Iré Zhekova who lent her voice to some of the game's music tracks says she "used an imaginary language because she wanted to explore the human voice and express the emotion beyond the words."

Reception

Bound by Flame received mixed reviews. It was criticized for its lack of deeper character development, relationship building with party members, poor AI system, short length, and poor combat that gives the game an unnecessary difficulty. Excessive and inappropriate swearing and profanity to give the game an artificial edge as well as out of place jokes and misplaced dialogue and information have also been cited. Kevin VanOrd of GameSpot stated that there are several questionable design choices such as when "you're asked to enter a name for your character—a name that is then summarily ignored by the game's supporting cast... This identity crisis may seem a minor detail, but it is a head-scratcher of an issue in a role-playing game full of head-scratchers, each one more stymieing than the last." Adam Beck of Hardcore Gamer had similar sentiment as other reviewers, opining "Bound by Flame is a charming RPG that's fundamentally and mechanically flawed."

On the other hand, Brittany Vincent of Destructoid wrote, "It's rough around the edges; a discount Witcher, by many counts, but it also possesses a certain degree of playability that I find devoid in other, more polished outings. And for that reason, despite its many confusing design decisions and mechanics, I commend developer Spiders on a job medium well." Others have praised the demon power's trade-off, crafting system, beautiful soundtrack, and that your choices and interactions factor heavily into how events play out and people react to you. Daniel Tack of Game Informer stated, "A skilled player doing no sidequests and blowing through dialogue can complete the game in about 10-12 hours, but this is sacrificing a ton of content both in the quest, exploration, and relationship-building categories... Bound by Flame is a solid romp and has plenty of ways to see your choices reflected in the world around you." Courtney Osborn of IGN echoed this writing, "Bound by Flame is a breath of fresh air in an otherwise crowded genre.  Spiders has achieved what many developers fail to ever do."

References

External links

2014 video games
Focus Entertainment games
Dark fantasy video games
Fantasy video games
Action role-playing video games
Hack and slash role-playing games
Linux games
PlayStation 3 games
PlayStation 4 games
Single-player video games
Video games about demons
Video games developed in France
Video games featuring protagonists of selectable gender
Video games scored by Olivier Deriviere
Windows games
Xbox 360 games
PhyreEngine games
Spiders (company) games